Sean Hall is an Australian curler.

Teams and events

References

External links

Video: 

Living people

Australian male curlers
Pacific-Asian curling champions

Date of birth missing (living people)
Place of birth missing (living people)
Year of birth missing (living people)
Sportspeople from Sydney